Thieves' Guild 4 is a 1981 role-playing game supplement published by Gamelords for Thieves' Guild.

Contents
Thieves' Guild 4 offers two new twists in the series.  First, the scenarios are designed to that thieves can play both sides in the struggle between the city thieves' guild and its splinter group, the Black Hand.  Second, two of the three scenarios stress information-gathering skills, and additional rules for perceptiveness and senses, and for tailing and avoiding tails, are included.

Reception
Lewis Pulsipher reviewed Thieves' Guild IV in The Space Gamer No. 46. Pulsipher commented that "If thieves are your favorite character, you should subscribe to Thieves Guild."

Lewis Pulsipher reviewed Thieves' Guild IV for White Dwarf #31, giving it an overall rating of 8 out of 10, and stated that "Gamelords's products are not for everyone, but a boon to the minority of FRPers at whom they are aimed."

References

Role-playing game supplements introduced in 1981
Thieves' Guild (role-playing game) supplements